This article lists events from the year 1999 in The Bahamas.

Incumbents 
 Monarch: Elizabeth II
 Governor-General: Sir Orvile Turnquest
 Prime Minister: Hubert Ingraham

Events
 September 14 – Hurricane Floyd hits the Bahamas

Deaths

See also
List of years in the Bahamas

References

Links

 
1990s in the Bahamas
Years of the 21st century in the Bahamas
Bahamas
Bahamas